Clavatula debilis is a species of sea snail, a marine gastropod mollusk in the family Clavatulidae.

Description
The elongate, fusiform and acuminate shell grows to a length of 14 mm. It contains eight rounded and ribbed whorls, transversely striate. The small ribs are round. The sutures are simple. The inner lip is crenulate. The siphonal canal is of mediocre length.

Distribution
This marine species occurs off New Guinea; in the Strait of Macassar, Indonesia; off the Philippines, Thailand and off Zanzibar; also off Darnley Island, Torres Straits.

References

External links
 
 Brazier, J. 1876. A list of the Pleurotomidae collected during the Chevert expedition, with the description of the new species. Proceedings of the Linnean Society of New South Wales 1: 151–162

debilis
Gastropods described in 1843
Marine molluscs of Asia